Aaron S. Zelman (March 14, 1946 – December 21, 2010) was an American gun rights advocate, author, and founder of Jews for the Preservation of Firearms Ownership.

Career
Zelman was best known as the founder and executive director of Jews for the Preservation of Firearms Ownership (JFPO), which he founded in 1989 in Wisconsin. He was an author and co-author of books and articles about gun rights, on which he took an absolutist stance on the meaning of the Second Amendment to the U.S. Constitution and encouraged Americans to understand, uphold, and defend the Bill of Rights. In addition, he produced and co-produced films on the subject.

Life
Zelman was born March 14, 1946, in Massachusetts, and reared in Tucson, Arizona, by his grandmother. He served in the U.S. Navy as a Corpsman to Marines (Fleet Marine Force Medic, Third Marine Air Wing), working as a psychiatric unit assistant to returning Vietnam War veterans. After different sales jobs, and work as a gun dealer, he ultimately settled in Wisconsin. Zelman was survived by his wife and two sons. One son later died from complications of Marfan syndrome.

Partial bibliography
 ""
 ""
 ""
 ""
 ""

Gran'pa Jack series
 ""
 ""
 ""

See also
 Anti-Defamation League

References

Further reading
 ""

External links
 Official Jews for the Protection of Firearms Ownership website

1946 births
2010 deaths
American gun rights activists
American fiction writers
American political writers
American male non-fiction writers
Jewish American writers
Writers from Tucson, Arizona
Activists from Arizona
American male novelists
21st-century American Jews
United States Navy corpsmen